The Sergeant Eric L. Coggins Award of Excellence was established in 1997 under the direction of Major General Walter B. Huffman, at the time the Judge Advocate General of the United States Army.  The purpose of the annual award is to recognize the junior enlisted Paralegal Specialist who best embodies the standards for which Coggins was known.

Coggins was a Paralegal Specialist in Korea whose skills led to his selection as the Noncommissioned Officer in Charge (NCOIC) of the Camp Stanley Legal Office while still a Specialist. After his Korean tour Coggins volunteered for duty in Kuwait where he became NCOIC of the Camp Doha Legal Office, and was awarded the Meritorious Service Medal. After his death from liver cancer, the award was established in his honor.

Recipients
SSG Roderick L. Armstrong, Jr. (2021) - 1st Cavalry Division, Ft Hood, TX
SSG Nathan Ramos(2019)
SGT DeJamine M. Bryson(2018) - 8th TSC, Schofield Barracks, HI
SSG Sarah E. Hawley (2017) - USAR Legal Command, Gaithersburg, MD 
SSG Cardia L. Summers (2016) - USASOC, 75th Ranger Regiment, Ft Benning, GA
SGT Maran E. Hancock (2015) - Ft Gordon, GA
SSG Angelica Pierce (2014) - Ft Gordon, GA
SSG Ana I. Hairston (2013) - 101st Airborne Division, Ft Campbell, KY
SSG Raymond Richardson, Jr. (2012) -  USASOC, 75th Ranger Regiment, Ft Benning, GA  
SSG Margarita G. Abbott (2011) - 82d Airborne Division, Ft Bragg, NC
SSG Juan C. Santiago (2010) - USARPAC, Hawaii
SSG Jose A. Velez (2009) - FORSCOM, Ft McPherson, GA
SSG Samuel R. Robles (2008) - USASOC, 75th Ranger Regiment, Ft Benning, GA
SSG Francisco R. Ramirez (2007) - Presidio, CA
SSG Joshua L. Quinton (2005) - USAREUR, Germany
SSG Troy D. Robinson (2004) - FORSCOM, Ft McPherson, GA
SSG Osvaldo Martinez, Jr. (2003) - USAREUR, Germany
SSG Melissa Burke (2002) - USAREUR, Germany
SGT Ryan L. Wischkaemper (2001) - USAREUR, Germany
SSG Michele L. Browning (2000) - USAREUR, Germany
SGT David M Panian (1999) - USASOC, Ft Bragg, NC
SSG Michelle A. Winston (1998) - FORSCOM, Ft McPherson, GA

References

External links

Military awards and decorations of the United States
Awards established in 1997